Shchapov is a Russian masculine surname, its feminine counterpart is Shchapova. Notable people with the surname include:

Afanasy Shchapov (1830–1876), Russian historian
Mikhail Shchapov (born 1975), Russian politician
Yelena Shchapova (born 1950), Russian model, writer, and poet

Russian-language surnames